The 2005 Women's Australian Hockey League was the 13th edition women's field hockey tournament. The tournament was held between 25 February – 10 April 2005.

QLD Scorchers won the tournament for the second time after defeating WA Diamonds 3–1 in the final. NSW Arrows finished in third place after defeating Adelaide Suns 4–0 in the third and fourth place playoff.

Participating Teams

 Canberra Strikers
 NSW Arrows
 Territory Pearls
 QLD Scorchers
 Adelaide Suns
 Tassie Van Demons
 Azuma Vipers
 WA Diamonds

Competition format
The 2005 Women's Australian Hockey League consisted of a single round robin format, followed by classification matches.

Teams from all 8 states and territories competed against one another throughout the pool stage. At the conclusion of the pool stage, the top four ranked teams progressed to the semi-finals, while the bottom four teams continued to the classification stage.

The first four rounds of the pool stage comprised two-legged fixtures based on aggregate scores to determine point allocation.

Point allocation

In the event of a draw, a penalty shoot-out was contested, with the winner receiving a bonus point. If a shootout occurred in both instances of a two-legged fixture, a bonus point was awarded to the winner of each shoot-out.

Results

Preliminary round

Pool

Fixtures

Classification round

Fifth to eighth place classification

Crossover

Seventh and eighth place

Fifth and sixth place

First to fourth place classification

Semi-finals

Third and fourth place

Final

Awards

Statistics

Final standings

Goalscorers

References

External links

2005
2005 in Australian women's field hockey
Sports competitions in Canberra